Sandyktau District is a district of Aqmola Region in northern Kazakhstan. The administrative center of the district is the selo of Balkashino. Population:

History 
Sandyktausky district was formed on January 17, 1928 as part of Petropavlovsky district with the center in the village of Balkashino. For a number of years it belonged to the Karaganda, North-Kazakhstan regions, and from October 14, 1939, it became part of the Akmola region.

From January 9, 1935, it was called Molotovsky, on August 30, 1957 it was renamed into Balkashinsky, and on November 14, 1997 it was renamed into Sandyktausky. There are 5 settlements in the region, which are over 100 years old.

References

Districts of Kazakhstan
Akmola Region